Alfred Voellmeke (December 19, 1874 – May 10, 1951) was an American racewalker. He competed in the 10 km walk at the 1912 Summer Olympics.

References

1874 births
1951 deaths
American male racewalkers
Olympic track and field athletes of the United States
Athletes (track and field) at the 1912 Summer Olympics
People from Wolfeboro, New Hampshire
Sportspeople from Carroll County, New Hampshire